Frank Lloyd Yalung Mamaril (born November 14, 1985) is a Filipino entertainment director and communication professor. He is the principal of his directorial firm FLM Creatives and Productions, handling several projects with the largest broadcasters and producers in the Philippines. He is the TV Director of Miss Universe Philippines 2022.

Education
Mamaril graduated in 2006 with a Bachelor of Arts in Communication Arts from the University of Santo Tomas in Manila. 
Mamaril was a member of the Tomasian Cable Television where he started directing programs and events in the University of Santo Tomas. He is a professor at the De La Salle-College of Saint Benilde in Manila.

Career
Mamaril started working in ABS-CBN as a production assistant and began directing television programs for Metro Channel. He is best known for TV directing the 2019 Southeast Asian Games Closing Ceremonies, the inaugural Miss Universe Philippines pageant in 2020, the Catholic Bishops Conference of the Philippines-commissioned music video of We Give Our Yes sang by Jamie Rivera for the celebration of the 500-year anniversary of Philippine Christianity, and Freedom: The Regine Velasquez Valentine Concert, which was Velasquez' first major online concert and has been recorded to be the highest-grossing digital concert produced in the Philippines.

Mamaril directed the music video of revived single Makita Kang Muli by Ebe Dancel and Regine Velasquez. He directed Lani Misalucha's 2016 concert entitled Love Catcher at Resorts World Manila, which won PMPC Star Awards Best Concert, beating nominated concerts featuring other top-rated OPM artists Regine Velasquez, Martin Nievera, Gary Valenciano, Sarah Geronimo, Erik Santos, Jed Madela, Angeline Quinto, Kyla, and Darren Espanto. Mamaril directed the 20th anniversary concert of OPM rockband Aegis at the Smart Araneta Coliseum, marketed as 20ble Dekada (Two Decades). He also directed Sue Ramirez in her first major concert at the Music Museum in 2019.

Mamaril directed music videos for singles by other top Filipino artists Vice Ganda, 4th Impact, Janella Salvador, Kim Chiu, Vina Morales, Ronnie Alonte, Jason Dy, Michael Pangilinan, Kakai Bautista, Enchong Dee, Darren Espanto, and Morissette Amon among others.

Select Accolades

Select TV Projects

References

1985 births
Living people
Filipino directors
People from Manila
Filipino expatriates in the United States
University of Santo Tomas alumni
ABS-CBN people